Ornes may refer to the following places:

 Ornes, Meuse, Grand Est, France
 Ornes, Vestland, Norway
 Ørnes, Nordland, Norway